The 1972 Ice Hockey World Championships was the 39th edition of the Ice Hockey World Championships. The tournament was held in Prague, Czechoslovakia from 7 to 22 April 1972, and the Czechoslovakia national team won the tournament, the third time they had done so and first since 1949, ending the Soviet Union's streak of nine consecutive titles. In addition it was the Czechoslovaks' 12th European title.

For the first time, a separate tournament is held for both the World Championships and the Winter Olympics. Previously, the Winter Olympics tournament was held in lieu of a world championships, with the winner being declared world champion for that year. It also marked the first time in international ice hockey that all goaltenders were required to wear face masks.

The American team, who had won the Silver medal earlier in the year at the Olympics, could not even win the 'B' pool, losing to Poland in their final game.

World Championship Group A (Czechoslovakia)

World Championship Group B (Romania)
Played in Bucharest from 24 March to 2 April.

Poland was promoted to Group A, both Norway and France were relegated to Group C. The French team boycotted the tournament in a protest over their federation's failure to finance the team's participation in the Sapporo OlympicsExplanation of Olympic controversy (in french)

World Championship Group C (Romania)
Played in Miercurea-Ciuc from 3 March to the 12th. The Chinese won their first game ever played in a World Championship.

Both Austria and Italy were promoted to Group B.

Ranking and statistics

Tournament Awards
Best players selected by the directorate:
Best Goaltender:       Jorma Valtonen
Best Defenceman:       František Pospíšil
Best Forward:          Alexander Maltsev
Media All-Star Team:
Goaltender:  Jiří Holeček
Defence:  Oldřich Machač,  František Pospíšil
Forwards:  Valeri Kharlamov,  Alexander Maltsev,  Vladimir Vikulov

Final standings
The final standings of the tournament according to IIHF:

European championships final standings
The final standings of the European championships according to IIHF:

Notes

References

 
Complete results at Passionhockey.com

IIHF Men's World Ice Hockey Championships
World Championships
International ice hockey competitions hosted by Czechoslovakia
Sports competitions in Prague
World Ice Hockey Championships, 1972
World Ice Hockey Championships
1970s in Prague
Miercurea Ciuc
World Ice Hockey Championships
1970s in Bucharest
Sports competitions in Bucharest
1971–72 in Romanian ice hockey
International ice hockey competitions hosted by Romania